Little Stevie Orbit is the third album by American singer-songwriter Steve Forbert.

Track listing
All songs written by Steve Forbert
"Get Well Soon" – 3:53
"Cellophane City" – 5:33
"Song for Carmelita" – 1:55
"Laughter Lou (Who Needs You?)" – 3:10
"Song For Katrina" – 3:30
"One More Glass of Beer" – 4:20
"Lucky" – 1:12
"Rain" – 3:10
"I'm An Automobile" – 2:58
"Schoolgirl" – 3:01
"If You've Gotta Ask You'll Never Know" – 2:15
"Lonely Girl" – 3:23
"A Visitor" – 4:27

Charts

Personnel
Steve Forbert – guitar, harmonica, vocals
Paul Errico – organ, accordion, piano on "I'm an Automobile" and "A Visitor"
Robbie Kondor – organ, piano on "I'm an Automobile" and "A Visitor"
Shane Fontayne – lead guitar
Hugh McDonald – bass
Bobby Lloyd Hicks – drums, percussion
Barry Lazarowitz – drums on "Lonely Girl"
Bill Jones – saxophone
Kenny Kosek – fiddle
Pete Solley - string arrangements
Technical
Steve Brown - recording, mixing
Elliott Landy - photography

References

1980 albums
Steve Forbert albums